Valentina Marocchi (born 15 December 1983) is an Italian diver.

She was born in Bolzano. She finished 23rd in the 3 metre springboard event of the 2004 Olympic Games, 32nd in the 10 metre platform event of the 2004 Olympic Games and fifteenth in the 10 metre platform event of the 2008 Olympic Games.

References

Italian female divers
1983 births
Living people
Divers at the 2004 Summer Olympics
Divers at the 2008 Summer Olympics
Olympic divers of Italy
Sportspeople from Bolzano
Divers of Centro Sportivo Carabinieri